The Canadian Screen Award for Best Children's or Youth Non-Fiction Program or Series is an annual television award, presented by the Academy of Canadian Cinema and Television to honour the year's best non-fiction television programming for children produced in Canada.

The award was first presented in 2002 as part of the Gemini Awards program. Prior to 2002, a single Gemini Award for Best Children's or Youth Program or Series was presented, inclusive of both fiction and non-fiction programming; in 2002, the award was split into separate categories for fiction and non-fiction programming.

Since 2013, the award has been presented as part of the Canadian Screen Awards.

Winners and nominees
Due to the distinction between the former Gemini Awards, which were usually presented in the late fall of the same year that the awards were presented for, and the current Canadian Screen Awards, which are presented early in the following year, for consistency awards are listed below under the year of eligibility rather than the year of presentation.

2000s

2002
  Street Cents
 21c
 The NewMusic: "Fight the Power: Music & Politics"
 VOX

2003
  Street Cents
 21c
 A MuchMusic Special: Afghanistan
 Mystery Hunters
 SmartAsk
 VOX

2004
  Swap TV
 21c
 POV Sports
 Street Cents
 VOX

2005
  Street Cents
 Angry Girls
 My Brand New Life
 Mystery Hunters
 nerve

2006
  Street Cents
 Heads Up!
 If the World Were a Village
 Prank Patrol
 Rocked: Sum 41 in Congo

2007
  Make Some Noise
 Ballet Girls
 Generation XXL
 Heads Up!
 Mystery Hunters

2008
  Ghost Trackers
 Drug Class
 Heads Up!
 Prank Patrol
 The Adrenaline Project

2009
  Mark's Moments
 Aquateam
 Mystery Hunters
 Sci Q

2010s

2010
  Canada's Super Speller
 A World of Wonders
 Survive This
 Mark's Moments

2011
  Mark's Moments
 Artzooka!
 In Real Life
 Spelling Night in Canada: Canspell 2011
 Survive This

2012
  Artzooka!
 Finding Stuff Out
 Giver
 The Next Star
 run run revolution

2013
  Splatalot!
 Cross Country Fun Hunt
 Extreme Babysitting
 Finding Stuff Out
 The Next Star

2014
  Japanizi: Going, Going, Gong!
 Gaming Show (In My Parents' Garage)
 Giver
 Museum Diaries
 The Next Star

2015
  Finding Stuff Out
 Giver
 Tiny Talent Time

2016
  Science Max: Experiments at Large
 Gaming Show (In My Parents' Garage)
 We Are Savvy

2017
 Science Max: Experiments at Large
Finding Stuff Out
The Mystery Files
This Is My Family
Undercover High

2018
 Science Max: Experiments at Large
Finding Stuff Out
Just Like Mom and Dad
When I Grow Up!

2019
 Just Like Mom and Dad
It's My Party!
Raven's Quest
Super Mighty Makers

2020s

2020
 Your Kids, Their Questions: A Your Morning Coronavirus Special
All-Round Champion
Backyard Beats
Every Child Matters
My Stay-at-Home Diary

2021
 All-Round Champion
Gabby's Farm
How Do You Feel?
My Home, My Life

2022
All-Round Champion
Gabby's Farm
Leo's Pollinators
Raven's Quest

References

Children's non-fiction